Patrocinio de Biedma y la Moneda (1858-1927) was a Spanish writer. Alongside her poetic output, she also wrote a dozen novels.

Biography
She was born in Begíjar in Jaen province in March 1858, the daughter of Diego José de Biedma y Marín Colón and Isabel María de la Moneda y Riofrío. Both her parents were descended from Andalusian nobility. Patrocinio is considered to be the first feminist of Jaen ("la primera feminista jiennense"). She lived for long periods in Baeza, dedicating some of her poems to the city. 

She was married in her teens to José María de Quadros y Arellano, the son of the Marques de San Miguel de la Vega. They had three children, all of whom died at an early age. Her husband also died. The death of her first child propelled Patrocinio into the world of writing. In 1877, she went to Cadiz accompanied by her good friend Princess Ratazzi. She founded the journal Cádiz and wrote for numerous publications of the time. She married for a second time; her new husband José Rodríguez y Rodríguez was chief archivist of the Diputación de Cádiz and ran the Crónica Gaditana. He too died early, in June 1914, leaving Patrocinio widowed for a second time.

Alongside her poetic output, Patrocinio also wrote a dozen novels through the latter decades of the 19th century. She died in Cádiz in September 1927.

References

1858 births
1927 deaths
Spanish women poets
Spanish women novelists
19th-century male writers
19th-century Spanish women writers
19th-century Spanish poets
19th-century Spanish novelists
People from the Province of Jaén (Spain)